Bungundarra is a rural locality in the Livingstone Shire, Queensland, Australia.

Geography 

History 
Bungundarra Provisional School opened in July 1912 as a half-time provisional school in conjunction with Barmoyea Provisional School (meaning they shared a single teacher). From the start of 1913 it became a full-time provisional school and became Bungundarra State School on 1 June 191. It closed on 10 July 1950.

Education 
There are no schools in the locality. The nearest primary schools are Farnborough State School in neighbouring Farnborough to the east and Yeppoon State School in Yeppoon to the south-east. The nearest secondary school is Yeppoon State High School in Yeppoon.

References 

Shire of Livingstone
Localities in Queensland